The 1997 Budapest Lotto Open was a women's tennis tournament played on outdoor clay courts in Budapest in Hungary that was part of Tier IV of the 1997 WTA Tour. It was the second edition of the tournament and was held from 22 April through 27 April 1997. Second-seeded Amanda Coetzer won the singles title.

Finals

Singles

 Amanda Coetzer defeated  Sabine Appelmans 6–1, 6–3
 It was Coetzer's 1st title of the year and the 7th of her career.

Doubles

 Amanda Coetzer /  Alexandra Fusai defeated  Eva Martincová /  Elena Wagner 6–3, 6–1
 It was Coetzer's 2nd title of the year and the 8th of her career. It was Fusai's 2nd title of the year and the 3rd of her career.

External links
 WTA Tournament Profile

Budapest Lotto Open
Budapest Grand Prix
Budapest 
Budapest